Kaye Lani Rae Rafko Wilson (born August 26, 1963) is the winner of the 1988 Miss America Pageant. She is from Monroe, Michigan, where a street is now named for her.

Biography
On September 19, 1987, Rafko was named as the Miss America 1988, after winning the Miss Michigan pageant of 1987. In the Miss America competition her platform included help for hospice services and her talent was a Tahitian dancing performance.  Rafko has participated in a number of fundraising activities and has been a vocal advocate for nursing and hospice programs.  She has addressed medical professional organizations around the world on the topic of nursing, including groups in Malaysia, Paris, Rome, and Singapore.

Rafko is a registered nurse and is married to Charles (Chuck) Wilson. They have three children: Nick, Alana and Joe. Rafko is the Executive Director of Gabby's Ladder, a bereavement program for children and their families, an organization she founded after the death of her fourth child. Other family included a younger brother, Nick, who played football at the University of Wisconsin–Madison from 1989 to 1993, and who was killed in a car accident on June 26, 1994.

Rafko  is a cohost of Only in Monroe, a monthly public-access television program, which was taken over by Late Show host Stephen Colbert for the July 2015 episode, with Wilson and rapper Eminem appearing as guests. She was also filmed in the 1989 documentary Roger & Me.

References

External links
 Kaye Lani Rae Rafko profile on MissAmerica.org
 
 Former Miss Michigans
 "After the reign" from The Toledo Blade (2003)

1963 births
American nurses
American women nurses
Living people
Miss America 1988 delegates
Miss America winners
People from Monroe, Michigan
Miss America Preliminary Swimsuit winners
20th-century American people
21st-century American women